Yuracyacu (possibly from Quechua Yuraq Yaku, yuraq white, yaku water, "white water") is a mountain in the Cordillera Blanca in the Andes of Peru, about  high. It is located in the Ancash Region, Huari Province, Chavín de Huantar District. It lies northeast of Queshque.

References

Mountains of Peru
Mountains of Ancash Region